Amade is a village in Ambegaon taluka of Pune District in the state of Maharashtra, India.The village is administered by a sarpanch who is an elected representative of village as per the constitution of India and Panchayati raj (India).

References

External links
  Villages in pune maharashtra

Villages in Pune district